Burkina Faso competed at the 1996 Summer Olympics in Atlanta, Georgia, United States.

Results by event

Athletics

Men 

Field events

Women 

Field events

Boxing

References
Official Olympic Reports

Nations at the 1996 Summer Olympics
1996
Oly